Anmol Tasveer is a 1978 Bollywood film directed by Satyen Bose.

Cast
Birbal
Manik Dutt
Preeti Ganguli
Anoop Kumar
Ashok Kumar

External links
 

1978 films
1970s Hindi-language films
Films directed by Satyen Bose